Bitanga i princeza (trans. The Lowlife and the Princess) is the fourth studio album by Yugoslav rock band Bijelo Dugme, released in 1979.

Bitanga i princeza was Bijelo Dugme's first album to feature Điđi Jankelić on drums. It was the band's last hard rock-oriented album before their switch to new wave in the following year.

In 1998, Bitanga i princeza was polled as the 10th on the list of 100 greatest Yugoslav rock and pop albums in the book YU 100: najbolji albumi jugoslovenske rok i pop muzike (YU 100: The Best Albums of Yugoslav Pop and Rock Music). In 2015, the album was pronounced the 15th on the list of 100 greatest Yugoslav albums published by Croatian edition of Rolling Stone.

Background

Personnel changes: Ivandić and Ristovski replaced with Jankelić and Pravdić

After the joint spring 1978 departure of drummer Ipe Ivandić and keyboardist Laza Ristovski—who ended up leaving together amid acrimony while working on their side project Stižemo—Bijelo Dugme got rejoined by former keyboardist Vlado Pravdić while Ivandić was replaced with Điđi Jankelić. Pravdić had previously left the band in fall 1976 to serve his mandatory Yugoslav People's Army (JNA) stint but ended up not reclaiming his spot even after being discharged from the army as Bregović decided to keep Ristovski permanently. Jankelić, on the other hand, was completely new to Bijelo Dugme, arriving via appearing on the band's vocalist Željko Bebek's solo album side project Skoro da smo isti (We're Almost the Same) that had been released several months earlier to poor reviews and inferior commercial reception.

The band started preparing their new studio album during early fall 1978 in Niška Banja‚ while Bijelo Dugme's leader Goran Bregović was still serving the army in Niš, but they definitely reunited in Sarajevo on 1 November.

Recording sessions
Originally, the band's record label, Jugoton, booked London's AIR Studios on Oxford Street (where the band's previous two studio albums had been recorded) for the end of November 1978 with a view of releasing the record in time for New Years holidays in Yugoslavia. However, as it became clear the band would not be able to record in November—and re-booking of AIR Studios could not be arranged on short notice—the recording sessions were moved to Belgrade. The album was recorded during January 1979 in PGP-RTB Studio in Belgrade followed by the mastering process in London's Abbey Road Studios. Just like the band's previous two studio albums, Bitanga i princeza was also produced by Neil Harrison. It did not feature the band's trademark folk-influenced hard rock sound, as it featured almost no folk music elements, while the ballads "Kad zaboraviš juli" and "Sve će to mila moja prekriti ruzmarin, snjegovi i šaš" featured a symphonic orchestra.

The making of the album was followed by censorship. The original cover, designed by Bijelo Dugme's old collaborator Dragan Stefanović and featuring female leg kicking male's genital area, was refused by the band's label, Jugoton as "vulgar". Stefanović then designed an entirely white album cover, but it was refused by Jugoton editors with the explanation that it would demand the album to be cheaper. The album ended up featuring a cover designed by Jugoton's designer Ivan Ivezić. The verse "Koji mi je moj" ("What the fuck is wrong with me") was excluded from the song "Ala je glupo zaboravit njen broj", and the verse "A Hrist je bio kopile i jad" ("And Christ was bastard and misery") from the song "Sve će to, mila moja, prekriti ruzmarin, snjegovi i šaš" was replaced with "A on je bio kopile i jad" ("And he was bastard and misery").

The album was released on 16 March 1979.

In April 1979, in an interview for Džuboks magazine, Bregović stated he accepted the label's request to change the lyrics, but that he objected the altering of Stefanović's cover: 

Bregović addressed the censorship of the "Ala je glupo zaboravit njen broj" and "Sve će to, mila moja, prekriti ruzmarin, snjegovi i šaš" lyrics: {{cquote|The swearword was dropped during the recording sessions, but this thing with Christ they [Jugoton] explained [it to us as] a 'political thing'. When they say 'political', the argument is over. That's the famous, universal explanation: 'It might cause a political inconvenience'. Although, I really don't see what sort of inconvenience it might've caused. In a country where you're free to believe in Christ, you are also free to be against Christ [...] although that song is not about Christ in any way. [...] He's there only to highlight a picture. The song's intention is not to deal with religion.}}

In 2005, on the recording of the documentary series Rockovnik, Bregović stated: "Now I probably wouldn't write that verse."

Track listing
All songs written by Goran Bregović.

Personnel
Goran Bregović – guitar
Željko Bebek – vocals
Zoran Redžić – bass
Điđi Jankelić – drums
Vlado Pravdić – keyboard

Additional personnel
Neil Harrison – producer
Maja Odžaklijevska – backing vocals
Slobodan Marković – synthesizer
Vojkan Borisavljević – arranged by (track 4)
Ranko Rihtman – arranged by (track 7)
Chris Blair – mastered by
Nick Glennie-Smith – recorded by
Rade Ercegovac – recorded by
Ivan Ivezić – design

ReceptionBitanga i princeza was upon its release praised by the critics as Bijelo Dugme's finest work until then. Almost every song on the album became a hit. The album broke all the records held by the band's previous releases. The final number of copies sold was about 320,000.

The tour following the album release was also successful. The band managed to sell out Belgrade's Pionir Hall for five times, dedicating all the money from these concerts to the victims of the 1979 Montenegro earthquake. On 22 September the band organized a concert under the name Rock spektakl '79. (Rock Spectacle '79) on JNA Stadium, with themselves as the headliners. The concert featured numerous opening acts: Crni Petak, Kilo i Po, Rok Apoteka, Kako, Mama Rock, Formula 4, Peta Rijeka, Čisti Zrak, Aerodrom, Opus, Senad od Bosne, Boomerang, Prva Ljubav, Revolver, Prljavo Kazalište, Tomaž Domicelj, Metak, Obećanje Proljeća, Suncokret, Parni Valjak, Generacija 5 and Siluete. More than 70,000 spectators attended the concert.

Legacy

The album was polled in 1998 as the 10th on the list of 100 greatest Yugoslav rock and pop albums in the book YU 100: najbolji albumi jugoslovenske rok i pop muzike (YU 100: The Best Albums of Yugoslav Pop and Rock Music).

In 2015, the album was pronounced the 15th on the list of 100 greatest Yugoslav albums published by Croatian edition of Rolling Stone.

In 2000, the songs "Bitanga i princeza" and "Sve će to, mila moja, prekriti ruzmarin, snjegovi i šaš" were polled as 14th and 17th respectively on the Rock Express Top 100 Yugoslav Rock Songs of All Times list. In 2006, "Sve će to, mila moja, prekriti ruzmarin, snjegovi i šaš" was polled as 14th on the B92 Top 100 Domestic Songs list.

Covers
Radio Television Novi Sad Big Band recorded a cover of "Sve će to, mila moja, prekriti ruzmarin, snjegovi i šaš" on their 1980 self-titled album.
Yugoslav pop trio Aska recorded a Bijelo Dugme songs medley on their 1982 album Disco Rock, featuring, among other Bijelo Dugme songs, "Ipak poželim neko pismo", "Na zadnjem sjedištu moga auta", "Bitanga i princeza" and "A koliko si ih imala do sad".
Serbian and Yugoslav rock singer Viktorija recorded a cover of "A koliko si ih imala da sad", entitled "Avantura – Ljubomora" ("Adventure – Jealousy"), on her 1995 album Ja znam da je tebi krivo (I Know You're Jealous).
In 1993, Bregović wrote music for the film Toxic Affair, and "Ipak poželim neko pismo" melody was used in the song "Man from Reno", sung by American singer-songwriter Scott Walker.
Serbian pop group Moby Dick recorded a cover of "Na zadnjem sjedištu moga auta" on their 1994 album Kreni! (Go!).
Željko Bebek recorded a version of "Na zadnjem sjedištu moga auta" for his 1995 solo album Puca mi u glavi (My Head is Going to Burst).
Croatian singer-songwriter Lea Dekleva recorded a cover of "Ipak poželim neko pismo" on her 2005 album emociJA (emotIon).
Croatian and Yugoslav rock singer Massimo Savić recorded a cover of "Sve će to, mila moja, prekriti ruzmarin, snjegovi i šaš" on his 2006 album Vještina II (Art II'').

References

External links
Bitanga i princeza at Discogs

Bijelo Dugme albums
Jugoton albums
1979 albums